St Mary the Virgin Church is located in the village of Blundeston near Lowestoft. It is an active Anglican parish church in the deanery of Lothingland, part of the archdeaconry of Norfolk, and the Diocese of Norwich.

St Mary the Virgin's Church was listed at Grade I on 27 November 1954.

History
The original building dates from the Anglo-Saxon era. The church tower has sections dating from the 11th century including the remnants of the former belfry. Other sections on the tower date from between the 15th to 16 century including the top third of the tower which was cast in redbrick. The church nave originally built in the 12th century and rebuilt in the 14th contains windows made between the 13th and 15th century
The chancel of the church contains brass inscriptions from the 17th century and located over the south door the arms of Charles II dated 1673.

See also 
Grade I listed buildings in Suffolk

References

External links

Church of England church buildings in Suffolk
1955 establishments in England
Grade I listed churches in Suffolk